Kurama is a genus of moths belonging to the subfamily Thyatirinae of the Drepanidae.

Species
 Kurama mirabilis Butler, 1879

Former species
 Kurama galbanus Tutt, 1891

References

Thyatirinae
Drepanidae genera